Kani Kouyaté (born August 8, 1990) is an Ivorian female professional basketball player.

References

External links
Profile at eurobasket.com

1990 births
Living people
Sportspeople from Abidjan
Ivorian women's basketball players
Shooting guards